Ouénou may refer to several places in Benin:

Ouénou, N'Dali
Ouénou, Nikki